Laudenbach is a German name originally meaning "loud stream". It may refer to:

Places
 Laudenbach, Bavaria, a town in Lower Franconia, Bavaria, Germany (postcode 63925)
 Laudenbach, Karlstadt, a village in Lower Franconia, Bavaria, Germany (postcode 97753)
 Laudenbach (Rhein-Neckar), a town in Baden-Württemberg, Germany (postcode 96514)
 Laudenbach (Weikersheim), a subdivision of Weikersheim, a town in Baden-Württemberg, Germany (postcode 97990)
 Ober-Laudenbach, a municipality of the town of Heppenheim in the state of Hesse, Germany (postcode 64646)

Rivers
 Laudenbach (Gelster), a river of Hesse, Germany, tributary of the Gelster
 Kleiner Laudenbach, a river of Bavaria, Germany

People with the surname
 Philippe Laudenbach (born 1936), French actor
 Pierre Jules Louis Laudenbach (1897–1975), better known as Pierre Fresnay, French stage and film actor
 Roland Laudenbach (1921–1991), French writer, editor, journalist, literary critic and scenarist
 Georg Karl Ignaz von Fechenbach zu Laudenbach (1749–1808), last Prince-Bishop of Würzburg, an ecclesiastical principality of the Holy Roman Empire

See also
 Lautenbach (disambiguation)
 Lauterbach (disambiguation)